Md Mahfuzur Rahman (born 1 December 1961) is a retired Bangladeshi general. He was a lieutenant general and the former Principal Staff Officer (PSO) under Prime Minister's Office and head of Armed Forces Division.

Early life and education
He was born on 1 December 1961 in Rajshahi district. He was a cadet of Jhenidah cadet college . In 1981 he graduated from Bangladesh Military Academy and was commissioned from 5th Long Course into the Corps of Infantry. He completed further studies in Staff College and Armed Forces War Course at Mirpur. He is a former adjutant general at Army headquarters.

He is a graduate of Defence Services Command and Staff College and Armed Forces War Course, Mirpur Bangladesh. He is also an alumnus of National Defence College, India (New Delhi) and Royal College of Defence Studies, UK (London). He completed a Masters in Defence Studies (MDS), War Studies (MWS) and Business Administration (MBA). He has also obtained M.Phil. from Madras University, India and PhD from Jahangirnagar University, Bangladesh.

He has edited a book, Indo-Bangladesh Trade Relations, and his second book, Non-Traditional Security Strategy for Addressing Trans-border Crime in Bangladesh, is awaiting publication.

Military career 
He commanded one infantry battalion, two infantry brigades and one infantry division of the Bangladesh Army. He has served as brigade major and general staff officer grade one and director military operations in the headquarters of the Bangladesh Army. He has also served as instructor in the Bangladesh Military Academy, directing the Staff of War Course at the National Defence College. He has also served as a commandant in Defence Service Command & Staff College and commandant in the School of Infantry & Tactics of the Bangladesh Army. He has served as the Adjutant General of the Bangladesh Army and vice chairman of Trust Bank.

UN mission 
Rahman has served in peace support operations under United Nations in Mozambique and Sierra-Leone.

References 

Living people
Bangladesh Army generals
Bangladeshi generals
1961 births
Principal Staff Officers (Bangladesh)
National Defence College, India alumni
Graduates of the Royal College of Defence Studies